Indrė Sorokaitė (born 2 July 1988) is a Lithuanian-born Italian volleyball player. She plays for Il Bisonte Firenze and for the Italy women's national volleyball team.

She was born in Kaunas, Lithuania, and moved to Italy with her mother at age 14. She started playing volleyball in Italy in 2003. In June 2013 she became an Italian citizen, and made her national team debut a few days later.

Awards

Clubs
 2006–07 CEV Women's Champions League -  Champion, with Volley Bergamo
 2007-08 Italian Cup (Coppa Italia) -  Champion, with Volley Bergamo
 2008–09 CEV Women's Champions League -  Champion, with Volley Bergamo
 2014 Italian Supercup -  Champion, with River Volley
 2019 Italian Supercup -  Champion, with Imoco Volley Conegliano
 2019 FIVB Volleyball Women's Club World Championship -  Champion, with Imoco Volley Conegliano
 2019-20 Italian Cup (Coppa Italia) -  Champion, with Imoco Volley Conegliano

References 

Living people
1988 births
Italian women's volleyball players
Volleyball players at the 2020 Summer Olympics
Olympic volleyball players of Italy
Lithuanian emigrants to Italy
Naturalised citizens of Italy
Italian people of Lithuanian descent
Sportspeople from Kaunas